Easy Software Products was the vendor who originally invented the Common Unix Printing System (CUPS) and HTMLDOC software.  It was founded near Washington, D.C. in 1993 and was located in Morgan Hill, California. ESP sold CUPS to Apple Inc. in 2007, but still developed and sold its HTMLDOC software until its closure.

References

External links
 HTMLDOC
 CUPS

Software companies based in Washington, D.C.
Software companies established in 1993
Defunct software companies of the United States